Downhill City is an album by 22-Pistepirkko. It was released in 1999 and contains the original soundtrack for the motion picture  by the Finnish director Hannu Salonen.

Track listing
 "Fabian's Theme"
 "Downhill City"
 "Fujisan"
 "Say Wrong"
 "Let The Romeo Weep" (Flamenco Mix)
 "Snowy Dave -99"
 "Doris Drives Away"
 "Sascha's Theme"
 "Where's The Home, Joey?"
 "Coffee Girl 2"
 "Truth"
 "Fujisan (Beatbox Jam)"
 "Roundabout 2"
 "Tokyo Tiger" (Aleksei Borisov Remix)

Personnel
 Andy McCoy - guitar
 22-Pistepirkko - programming, mixing, producing, engineering
 Pauli Saastamoinen - mastering

22-Pistepirkko albums
1999 soundtrack albums
Film soundtracks